Jan Čuřík (1 November 1924 – 4 December 1996) was a Czech cinematographer whose work was featured in many Czechoslovak films.

Biography
Jan Čuřík was born in Prague, Czechoslovakia. He began working as a camera assistant in Krátký film Praha. Later he filmed short films and documentaries for the Army. In 1958, he served as cameraman for Zbyněk Brynych's Suburban Romance, which was Czechoslovakia's entry in the 1958 Cannes Film Festival.

He often worked with director Jaromil Jireš, and was the cinematographer for many of his most popular films, including The Joke, and Valerie and her Week of Wonders. He also frequently worked with Zbyněk Brynych and Karel Kachyňa. In 1961, he worked on The Gleiwitz Case in East Germany. In 1966, he co-directed Searching with Antonín Máša.

Selected filmography
 1955: The Tank Brigade
 1958: Suburban Romance
 1960: The White Dove
 1961: The Gleiwitz Case
 1962: Transport from Paradise
 1963: Joseph Kilian
 1963: Something Different
 1964: Courage for Every Day
 1966: Searching
 1969: The Joke
 1970: Valerie and her Week of Wonders
 1972: And Give My Love to the Swallows
 1973: Lovers in the Year One
 1975: The Day That Shook the World
 1979: Love Between the Raindrops
 1984: The Nurses

Awards
 Valerie and her Week of Wonders – Silver Hugo for Best Color Cinematography at 1971 Chicago International Film Festival 
 The White Dove – Medal of the Biennale - Out of Competition at 21st Venice International Film Festival

References

External links
 
 In Memoriam

1924 births
1996 deaths
Czech cinematographers
Mass media people from Prague